Soyuz TM-9 was the ninth expedition to the Russian Space Station Mir.

Crew

Mission highlights

During docking, cosmonauts aboard Mir noticed that three of the eight thermal blankets (layers of foil vacuum-shield insulation) on the descent module of the approaching Soyuz-TM 9 spacecraft had come loose from their attachments near the heat shield, yet remained attached at their top ends. The main concern was that the capsule might cool down, permitting condensation to form inside and short out its electrical systems. There was also fear that the blankets might block the infrared vertical sensor, which oriented the module for reentry.

Three other areas of concern emerged: that the explosive bolts binding the service module to the descent module might fail to work after direct exposure to space, that the heat shield might be compromised by direct space exposure, and that an EVA to repair the blankets might cause additional damage. Consideration was given to flying Soyuz TM-10 with one cosmonaut aboard as a rescue mission. During an EVA, the cosmonauts folded back two of the three blankets and left the third alone. During reentry, the cosmonauts ejected both the orbital module and the service module simultaneously in an effort to minimize the chances that a blanket could snag. Normally the orbital module went first. The descent module suffered no damage as a result of its prolonged exposure to space conditions. Reentry occurred as normal.

References

Crewed Soyuz missions
1990 in the Soviet Union
Spacecraft launched in 1990